"I Am That Man" is a song written by Terry McBride and Monty Powell, and recorded by American country music duo Brooks & Dunn.  It was released in June 1996 as the second single released from their album Borderline.  The song peaked at number 2 on the Billboard Hot Country Singles & Tracks chart.

Critical reception
Deborah Evans Price, of Billboard magazine reviewed the song favorably, calling it "an earnest song of love and devotion that is marked by Ronnie Dunn's tender lead vocals." She goes on to say that the "production is gentle and understated, allowing Dunn to wrap his voice around the lyric and deliver a poignant interpretation."

Misheard lyric
Many fans have misheard the title in the chorus as "I am Batman".

Chart positions
"I Am That Man" debuted at number 73 on the Billboard Hot Country Songs chart for the week of April 27, 1996. It fell out and re-entered at number 71 on the June 1, 1996 chart.

Year-end charts

References

1996 singles
1996 songs
Brooks & Dunn songs
Songs written by Terry McBride (musician)
Song recordings produced by Don Cook
Arista Nashville singles
Songs written by Monty Powell